The Moe River is a perennial river of the West Gippsland catchment, located in the West Gippsland region of the Australian state of Victoria.

Location and features
The river descends  over its  course.

See also

 Rivers of Victoria

References

External links
 
 

West Gippsland catchment
Rivers of Gippsland (region)